Kristen is a first name, also the Breton, Danish, Swedish and Norwegian form of Christian. As a result, Kristen is a male name in Norway, Sweden and Denmark, with the female equivalent spelt as Kristin, a Scandinavian form and a variation of Christine. In Breton, Kristen is both a male and female name. In English-speaking countries, Kristen is now usually a female name, used as an alternative spelling of Kristin, with the Kristen spelling having become the more popular spelling of the name in English-speaking countries for newborn girls by the mid 1970s.

Spelling variants
In Denmark, the name can also be spelt Christen. In Iceland, the name Kristinn is used, and is often mistaken as female by other Europeans.

List of people with the given name Kristen

A
Kristen Alderson (born 1991), American actress and singer
Kristen Soltis Anderson (born 1984), American journalist
Kristen Anderson-Lopez (born 1972), American songwriter
Kristen Arnett (born 1980), American fiction author and essayist
Kristen Ashburn (born 1973), American photojournalist
Kristen Ashley (born 1986), American author

B
Kristen Babb-Sprague (born 1968) American synchronized swimmer
Kristen Barbara (born 1992), Canadian ice hockey player
Kristen Barnhisel, American winemaker
Kristen Beams (born 1984), Australian cricket player
Kristen Bell (born 1980), American actress
Kristen Walsh Bellows (born 1982), American racquetball player
Kristen Berset (born 1981), American beauty pageant contestant
Kristen Bicknell (born 1986), Canadian professional poker player
Kristen Bowditch (born 1975), British former long-distance runner
Kristen Kyrre Bremer (1925–2013), Norwegian theologian and clergyman
Kristen Britain, American author
Kristen Bujnowski (born 1992), Canadian bobsledder
Kristen Buckley (born 1968), American author
Kristen Butler (born 1984), American softball player

C
Kristen Caverly (born 1984), American swimmer
Kristen Cloke (born 1968), American actress
Kristen Condon, Australian actress
Kristen Connolly (born 1980), American actress and tennis player
Kristen Cox (born 1969), American politician

D
Kristen Dalton (born 1966), American actress
Kristen Dalton (born 1986), American beauty pageant contestant
Kristen DeAngelis, American microbiologist and environmental activist
Kristen Dexter (born 1961), American politician

E
Kristen Edmonds (born 1987), American soccer player
Kristen Eik-Nes (1922–1992), Norwegian medical scientist

F
Kristen Feilberg (1839–1919), Danish photographer
Kristen K. Flaa (1925–2021), Norwegian politician
Kristen Fløgstad (born 1947), Norwegian triple and long jumper
Kristen Flores (born 1982), American actress and film producer
Kristen Foster (born 1987), Canadian curler
Kristen French (1976–1992), Canadian homicide victim

G
Kristen R. Ghodsee (born 1970), American ethnographer
Kristen Gilbert (born 1967), American serial killer
Kristen Gislefoss (born 1954), Norwegian meteorologist
Kristen Gran Gleditsch (1867–1946), Norwegian military officer and topographer
Kristen Graczyk (born 1993), American soccer player
Kristen Gremillion (born 1958), American anthropologist
Kristen Marie Griest, American military officer
Kristen Gundelach (1891–1971), Norwegian poet and translator

H
Kristen Hager (born 1984), Canadian actress
Kristen Hamilton (born 1992), American soccer player
Kristen den Hartog (born 1965), Canadian writer
Kristen Heiss (born 1987), American swimmer
Kristen Holbø (1869–1953), Norwegian painter and illustrator
Kristen Holden-Ried (Kris Holden-Ried; born 1973), Canadian actor
Kristen Hughes (born 1979), Australian netball player

I
Kristen Iversen, American writer

J
Kristen Jenner (Kris Jenner; born 1955), American television personality
Kristen Johnson, American magician
Kristen Johnson (born 1982), American beauty pageant contestant
Kristen Johnston (born 1967), American actress

K
Kristen Kelly, American singer
Kristen Kish (born 1984), American chef and television personality
Kristen Kjellman (born 1984), American lacrosse player

L
Kristen Lange (born 1988), American squash player
Kristen Ledlow (born 1988), American reporter
Kristen Li (born 2002), American voice actress known for The Powerpuff Girls
Kristen Lippincott, English art historian
Kristen Luneberg, American beauty pageant contestant

M
Kristen-Paige Madonia, American writer
Kristen Maloney (born 1981), American gymnast
Kristen Mann (born 1983), American basketball player
Kristen May, American musician
Kristen McGuire, American voice actress
Kristen McMenamy (born 1964), American model
Kristen Meadows (born 1957), American actress
Kristen Meier (born 1991), American soccer player
Kristen Merlin (born 1984), American musician
Kristen Merlino, American art director
Kristen Michal (born 1975), Estonian politician
Kristen Miller (born 1976), American actress
Kristen Morgin (born 1968), American sculptor

N
Kristen Newlin (born 1985), Turkish American basketball player
Kristen Nygaard (1926–2002), Norwegian computer scientist and politician
Kristen Nygaard (footballer) (born 1949), Danish footballer

O
Kristen Øyen (born 1938), Norwegian forester

P
Kristen Pazik (born 1978), TAMIL NADU model
Kristen Pfaff (1967–1994), American musician

R
Kristen Renton (born 1982), American actress
Kristen Rohlfs (born 1930), German astronomer
Kristen Roth (born 1985), American skater
Kristen Rudisill (born 1975), American culture scientist
Kristen Ruhlin (born 1984), American actress
Kristen Rutherford (born 1968), American writer

S
Kristen Schaal (born 1978), American actress
Kristen Schlukebir (born 1987), American tennis player
Kristen Silverberg (born 1971), American diplomat
Kristen Simmons, American writer
Kristen Skjeldal (born 1967), Norwegian cross-country skier
Kristen Stewart (born 1990), American actress
Kristen A. Stilt, American Islamic studies scholar

T
Kristen Taunton (born 1977), Canadian field hockey player
Kristen Thomson (born 1966), Canadian actress and playwright
Kristen Thorsness (born 1960), American rower

V
Kristen Vadgaard (1886–1979), Danish gymnast
Kristen Valkner (1903–1972), Norwegian clergyman and historian
Kristen Veal (born 1981), Australian basketball player
Kristen Vigard (born 1963), American actress and singer
Kristen Viikmäe (born 1979), Estonian footballer

W
Kristen Welker (born 1976), American television journalist
Kristen Wiig (born 1973), American actress
Kristen Wilson (born 1969), American actress

Fictional characters
Kristen DiMera, character from American soap opera Days of Our Lives
Kristen, a character in Barney & Friends, played by Sara Hickman

See also
Kristin (name), given name
Christen (disambiguation), a given name and surname
Christin, given name

Notes 

English-language unisex given names
English-language feminine given names
English feminine given names
English unisex given names
Unisex given names
Feminine given names
Surnames from given names